Space Nova is an animated television series developed for the Nine Network and Australian Broadcasting Corporation that premiered on 9Go! in Australia on 5 March 2021. A full 13-eps marathon premiered on ABC ME on 2 April 2021 starting from 7:55am. ABC ME and Sydney’s Powerhouse Museum conducted a premiere screening of Space Nova on April 7 2021 from 1 – 2PM at the Powerhouse Theatrette. The show also premiered in Singapore on Mediacorp's MeWATCH.

The 26-episode of 24-minute children's series is screening on Nine, ABC, Super RTL and distributed globally by ZDF Enterprises.

Plot

Production
The series was co-produced by Australia's SLR Productions and Giggle Garage in Malaysia. Voice Director is Jo Boag, Series Director is Pablo de la Torre with Cindy Scharka and Gie Santos as Episodic Directors. The series is produced by Suzanne Ryan, Juhaidah Jeomin and Yasmin Jones. The Head Writer is multi-Australian Writers’ Guild Award winner Thomas Duncan-Watt. The Executive Producers are Suzanne Ryan and Zeno Gabing.

Cast
Zachary Fuller as Jet Nova
Adelaide Tustian as Adelaide Nova
Stephen James King as Hugo Nova
Michelle Doake as Josie Nova
Darren Sabadina as G9
Rae Johnston as Janali Banks
Ash Ricardo as Aubrina Eridani
Christian Charisiou as Sol Erdani
Jason Chong as Andy Ling
Tim Harding as Avery Yu
Mary Lascaris as Jennylyn Chu

Episode

References

External links 
 

2020s Australian animated television series
2021 Australian television series debuts
Australian children's animated action television series
Australian children's animated adventure television series
Malaysian children's animated adventure television series
Malaysian children's animated comedy television series
English-language television shows
Nine Network original programming
Australian Broadcasting Corporation original programming